Darbahn is a village in Dhar Kalan in Gurdaspur district of Punjab State, India. The village is administrated by Sarpanch an elected representative of the village.

Demography 
, The village has a total number of 103 houses and the population of 527 of which 282 are males while 245 are females according to the report published by Census India in 2011. The literacy rate of the village is 67.70%, lower than the state average of 75.84%. The population of children under the age of 6 years is 75 which is 14.23% of total population of the village, and child sex ratio is approximately 870 lower than the state average of 846.

Most of the people are from Schedule Caste which constitutes 24.10% of total population in the village. The town does not have any Schedule Tribe population so far.

As per census 2011, 322 people were engaged in work activities out of the total population of the village which includes 178 males and 124 females. According to census survey report 2011, 76.71% workers describe their work as main work and 23.29% workers are involved in marginal activity providing the livelihood for less than 6 months.

Transport 

See also
List of villages in India

References 

Villages in Gurdaspur district